The Thüringen Philharmonie Gotha-Eisenach is a symphony orchestra in the city of Gotha.

History

Gotha State Orchestra 
Ever since Ernest I, Duke of Saxe-Gotha founded a Staatskapelle in 1651, Gotha had had a local orchestra. This gave rise to the "Landeskapelle Gotha".

Gotha State Symphony Orchestra 
After the dissolution of the States in the GDR in 1952, the name Landeskapelle was no longer desired. The Landeskapelle Gotha was renamed the "Staatliches Sinfonieorchester Gotha".

Thuringia State Symphony Orchestra Gotha 
After the Peaceful Revolution, the "Gotha State Symphony Orchestra" was renamed "Landessinfonieorchester Thüringen Gotha".

Thuringia Philharmonic Orchestra Gotha-Suhl 
In 1998, the "Landessinfonieorchester Thüringen Gotha" was united with the "Thüringen Philharmonie Suhl" (until 1979: "Staatliches Sinfonieorchester Suhl") founded in 1953. Dirigenten des Suhler Orchesters waren Siegfried Geißler, Claus Peter Flor and Olaf Koch gewesen. The new orchestra was called "Thüringen Philharmonie Gotha-Suhl".

Thüringen Philharmonie Gotha 
In 2009, there was a drastic change at the Thüringen Philharmonie. Due to austerity measures, the state of Thuringia cut its subsidies for theatres and orchestras in Thuringia. In addition, the city of Suhl discontinued its co-sponsorship and co-financing of the Thuringia Philharmonic Gotha-Suhl on 31 December 2008 due to empty city coffers. Thus, the Thuringia Philharmonic Orchestra Gotha-Suhl was short of 1 million euros, which eventually led to a reduction of the orchestra's membership by 17 musicians to 51 members. The continued existence of the renowned orchestra was finally secured by a further increase in financial subsidies from the city of Gotha and the district of Gotha. The name of the orchestra was changed to Thüringen Philharmonie Gotha on 1 January 2009 following the withdrawal of the city of Suhl.

Thuringia Philharmonic Orchestra Gotha-Eisenach 
At the beginning of the 2017/2018 season, the "Thüringen Philharmonie Gotha" merged with the "Landeskapelle Eisenach" to form the "Thüringen Philharmonie Gotha-Eisenach". 20 musicians from the Landeskapelle Eisenach transferred to the Thüringen Philharmonie Gotha-Eisenach. On 7 September 2017, the merged orchestra gave its first entitlement concert at the Stadthalle Gotha under the motto "Music in Fusion".

Profile 
The Thuringia Philharmonic Orchestra Gotha-Eisenach gives mainly symphonic concerts, occasionally also chamber music concerts at the two locations Gotha and Eisenach. It takes over the musical part of opera and ballet performances and accompaniment at choral concerts.

In 2001, on the occasion of the 350th anniversary of the founding of the Gotha Court Orchestra - whose tradition was continued by the Thuringia Philharmonic Orchestra Gotha-Suhl - the Baroque Festival was newly introduced, which has since been organised annually by the Friedenstein Palace Gotha Foundation. In addition, the orchestra has made a name for itself nationwide through its regular performances of major church music works in collaboration with various church choirs..

In December 2014, Michaela Barchevitch became the orchestra's Executive Director. In the 2017/2018 season, Russell Harris was interim principal conductor. Since September 2019, Markus Huber has been principal Conductor. First concertmasters are Alexej Barchevitch and Seth Taylor.

Recordings 
The Thüringen Philharmonie Gotha has recorded a large number of CDs. The CD series Musik am Gothaer Hof (Music at the Gotha Court) has received several awards: it presents composers such as Georg Anton Benda, Andreas Romberg, Johann Ludwig Böhner, Louis Spohr and other personalities of Gotha's musical life in the 17th and 18th centuries.

 Musik am Gothaer Hof - Anton Schweitzer (arias and orchestral works) by Stejskal, Breuer, Thuringia Philharmonic Orchestra and Anton Schweitzer (Audio-CD - 2011)
 Musik am Gothaer Hof - Andreas Romberg by Hermann Breuer, Andreas J. Romberg and Thuringia Philharmonic Orchestra Gotha-Suhl (Audio-CD - 2011)
 Musik am Gothaer Hof - Georg Anton Benda (orchestral works and solo concertos) by Masurenko, Plagge, Breuer and Thuringia Philharmonic Orchestra (Audio-CD - 2011)
 Musik am Gothaer Hof – Vol. 1 by Barschewitsch, Breuer, Thüringen Philharmonie and Johann Ludwig Böhner (Audio-CD - 2011)
 Musik am Gothaer Hof – Vol. 2 by Thunemann, Breuer, Thüringen Philharmonie and Johann Ludwig Böhner (Audio-CD - 2011)
 Musik am Gothaer Hof - Louis Spohr Double Concertos by Hermann Breuer, Antje Weithaas and Michael Sanderling (Audio-CD - 2011)
 Clarinet Concerto 1 and 2 and Op. 2 by Gerhard & Thüringen Philharmonie Suhl Amann (Audio-CD - 2011)
 Piano Concerto 1 and 2 by Julian Evans & Thüringen Philharm.Suhl (Audio-CD - 2011)
 Mozart and Salieri by Roberto Sacca, Thomas Mohr and Nikolai Rimsky-Korssakoff (Audio-CD - 2003)
 Teatro Musicale-Vol. 3 by Taha, Keuper, Mulder and Näck (Audio-CD - 2003) - Double CD
 First Symphony / Toccata by Peter Jona Korn (Audio-CD - 2002) - Import
 Weimar Time Travels in Music by Various (Audio CD - 1999) - Double CD
 Music for Saxophone by Detlef Bensmann and Dietrich Erdmann (Audio-CD - 1996)
 Symphony 1 / Cockaigne Ouverture by Stephen Somary and Edward Elgar (Audio-CD - 1996)

References

Further reading 
 Ronald Schäfer (Red.): Festschrift der Thüringen-Philharmonie Gotha-Suhl. 350 Jahre Gothaer Orchester – 50 Jahre Sinfonieorchester Gotha. Thüringen Philharmonie Gotha-Suhl, Gotha 2001.

External links 

 
 

Thuringia
German symphony orchestras